Severino Minelli (6 September 1909 – 23 September 1994) was a Swiss footballer who played as a defender. He participated in the 1934 FIFA World Cup and the 1938 FIFA World Cup. He played a total of 80 matches for Switzerland.

He played as a sweeper in the revolutionary formation developed by the Austrian coach Karl Rappan in Grasshopper-Club Zurich as well as in Switzerland national football team, the "verrou" ("the bolt").

He coached FC Zürich and Switzerland.

References

1909 births
1994 deaths
People from Küsnacht
Swiss men's footballers
Switzerland international footballers
1934 FIFA World Cup players
1938 FIFA World Cup players
Servette FC players
Grasshopper Club Zürich players
FC Zürich players
Swiss football managers
FC Zürich managers
Switzerland national football team managers
Association football defenders
Sportspeople from the canton of Zürich